The 2020–21 Stetson Hatters men's basketball team represented Stetson University in the 2020–21 NCAA Division I men's basketball season. The Hatters, led by 2nd-year head coach Donnie Jones, played their home games at the Edmunds Center in DeLand, Florida as members of the Atlantic Sun Conference. They finished the season 12-15, 7-9 to finish in 7th place. They defeated Bellarmine in the quarterfinals of the Atlantic Sun tournament before losing in the semifinals to Liberty. They received an invitation to the CBI where they defeated Bowling Green in the quarterfinals before losing in the semifinals to Coastal Carolina.

Previous season
The Hatters finished the 2019–20 season 16–17, 9–7 in ASUN play to finish in a tie for third place. As the #4 seed in the ASUN tournament, the Hatters defeated the #5 seed North Alabama in the quarterfinals, 82–72, before falling to the top seed and eventual champions, Liberty, in the semifinals, 62–66.

Roster

Schedule and results

|-
!colspan=12 style=| Non-conference regular season

|-
!colspan=12 style=| Atlantic Sun Conference regular season

|-
!colspan=12 style=| Atlantic Sun tournament
|-

|-
!colspan=12 style=| CBI
|-

|-

Source

References

Stetson Hatters men's basketball seasons
Stetson Hatters
Stetson Hatters men's basketball
Stetson Hatters men's basketball
Stetson